John Johansson i Brånsta  (1894–1954) was a Swedish politician. He was a member of the Centre Party.

References
This article was initially translated from the Swedish Wikipedia article.

Centre Party (Sweden) politicians
1894 births
1954 deaths
20th-century Swedish politicians